UW Health University Hospital (UW Health, University of Wisconsin Hospital and Clinics or UWHC) is a 515-bed academic regional referral center with 127 outpatient clinics, located on the western edge of the University of Wisconsin–Madison's campus in Madison, Wisconsin. It is an American College of Surgeons designated Level I adult and pediatric trauma center, one of only two in Wisconsin. UW Health University Hospital has seven intensive care units (trauma and life support (TLC), pediatric, neonatal, cardiac, cardiothoracic, burn, neurosurgery). UW Health University Hospital was ranked by U.S. News & World Report as the 16th best hospital in the United States and the #1 hospital in Wisconsin in the publication's 2021-2022 Best Hospitals Honor Roll, earning national rankings in 10 adult and 6 pediatric specialties. Additionally, UW Health University Hospital was ranked as the 22nd best hospital in the United States and #84th Best Hospitals in the world by Newsweek in 2022. 

UW Health describes itself as "the integrated health system of the University of Wisconsin–Madison." It is the primary teaching affiliate of the University of Wisconsin School of Medicine and Public Health (whose main building, the Health Sciences Learning Center, is connected to UW Health University Hospital). It is also the primary teaching affiliate of the University of Wisconsin–Madison's School of Nursing and School of Pharmacy, and is a teaching affiliate of Edgewood College's Henry Predolin School of Nursing.

UW Health University Hospital is home to the University of Wisconsin Carbone Cancer Center, one of 40 National Cancer Institute-designated Comprehensive Cancer Centers. UW Health also operates the American Family Children's Hospital, a 110-bed pediatric hospital located adjacent to University Hospital, as well as UW Health at the American Center, a 59-bed hospital and emergency room located on the Northeast Side of Madison. Additionally, UW Health operates a network of outpatient clinics at over 80 sites throughout southern and central Wisconsin and northern Illinois, and has partnerships with UnityPoint Meriter Hospital in Madison, Beloit Hospital in Beloit, Wisconsin, and Swedish American Hospital in Rockford, Illinois. UW Health also has an affiliated insurance company, Quartz Health Solutions, Inc., operated in partnership with UnityPoint Health and Gundersen Health System. 

UW Health serves over 800,000 patients per year, and employs over 1,900 physicians and 2,100 staff across seven hospitals, making it the second-largest employer in Madison (after UW–Madison) and in Wisconsin. 

UW Health University Hospital is home to a helipad that serves UW Med Flight, the hospital's air ambulance and ground ambulance service.

History 

UW Hospital and Clinics was established by the Wisconsin Legislature in 1924. Originally named Wisconsin General Hospital, the facility's first location was at 1300 University Avenue. In 1979, it moved to a new facility at 600 Highland Avenue, Madison, Wisconsin, and the original building was converted for use by the university as classrooms. Formerly part of the University of Wisconsin System, UW Hospital and Clinics was reorganized as a public authority, the University of Wisconsin Hospital and Clinics Authority (UWHCA), on June 29, 1996. Since May 2016, UWHC's current CEO has been Alan Kaplan, MD. 

The hospital and clinics are directed by statute to: 
"maintain, control and supervise the use of the University of Wisconsin Hospitals and Clinics, for the purposes of:
 Delivering comprehensive, high−quality health care to patients using the hospitals and to those seeking care from its programs, including a commitment to provide such care for the medically indigent.
 Providing an environment suitable for instructing medical and other health professions students, physicians, nurses and members of other health−related disciplines.
 Sponsoring and supporting research in the delivery of health care to further the welfare of the patients treated and applying the advances in health knowledge to alleviate human suffering, promote health and prevent disease.
 Assisting health programs and personnel throughout the state and region in the delivery of health care."

American Family Children's Hospital
American Family Children's Hospital (AFCH) is a pediatric acute care hospital located adjacent to UW Health University Hospital in Madison, Wisconsin. The hospital has 101 beds and is affiliated with The University of Wisconsin School of Medicine and Public Health. The hospital is a member of University of Wisconsin Hospital and Clinics. The hospital provides comprehensive pediatric specialties and subspecialties to infants, children, teens, and young adults aged 0–21 throughout Wisconsin and surrounding states. American Family Children's Hospital features the only pediatric Level 1 Trauma Center in the region, and 1 of 2 in the state.

UW Health opened the American Family Children's Hospital on August 29, 2007. The $78 million facility was funded by $41 million in private donations, which included $10 million contributed by American Family Insurance, and $37 million in bonds.

Awards 
In 2021, AFCH ranked nationally in two different specialties on the U.S. News & World Report: Best Hospitals; #36 in pediatric cardiology and #50 in pediatric nephrology.

UW Health at The American Center (East Madison Hospital)
UW Health also operates UW Health at The American Center(East Madison Hospital), located in the American Center business park on the northeast side of Madison. The hospital includes 56 beds and an emergency room. The campus also includes the UW Health Rehabilitation Hospital, and 1.5 miles away, the UW Health East Clinic. On April 12, 2022 UW Health announced the name change of "The American Center ((TAC)) Hospital to the name of "UW Health East Madison Hospital".

Employee relations 
Employees of the UWHC negotiated their contracts on a separate schedule from employees of the UW System. This right was removed when the passage of a bill to limit collective bargaining rights was passed.

Recognition 
 In 2022, UW Hospital and Clinics (UWHC) was named the top hospital in Wisconsin by U.S. News & World Report for the eleventh consecutive year.
 UW Hospital and Clinics received "magnet hospital" designation by the American Nurses Credentialing Center in 2009.
 UW Hospital and Clinics was named the #1 academic medical center nationwide for outstanding nursing quality in 2009 by American Nurses Association, based on performance on the National Database of Nursing Quality Indicators (NDNQI).
 UW Hospital and Clinics ranked among the top five academic health centers nationwide in a University HealthSystem Consortium benchmarking study of safety, mortality, clinical effectiveness and equity in delivering care, 2008.
 UW Hospital and Clinics ranked among the top 50 in the nation in 15 medical specialties in the most recent (2016) U.S. News & World Report hospital ranking. Additionally, the American Family Children's Hospital was ranked among the top 50 in the nation in five medical specialties in the same report.”
 UW Hospital and Clinics named among "100 Best Companies" in the nation by Working Mother magazine in 2007 and 2008.
 The Hospital and Clinics' Heart and Vascular Care program listed among top 100 hospital programs in the Thomson Reuters Cardiovascular Benchmarks for Success, 2004–2008.

See also
UW Carbone Cancer Center
UW Med Flight

References

External links
 UW Health home page
American Family Children's Hospital home page
UW Health at The American Center
 Wisconsin General Hospital in The Buildings of the University of Wisconsin

Hospital buildings completed in 1974
University of Wisconsin–Madison
Buildings and structures in Madison, Wisconsin
Teaching hospitals in Wisconsin
Hospitals established in 1924
1924 establishments in Wisconsin

Trauma centers